Carmen Stănescu (29 July 1925 – 11 April 2018) was a Romanian stage and film actress. She was born in Bucharest and died in Snagov.

Filmography
 Bădăranii (1960) as Felice, Canciano Tartuffola's wife
 Frații Jderi (1974) 
 Premiera (1976) as Alexandra Dan, wife of Mihai
 Povestea dragostei (1977)
 Războiul de Independență 1977
 Mușchetarul român, directed by Gheorghe Vitanidis, 1975
 Tinerețe fără bătrânețe, directed by Elisabeta Bostan, 1969
 Runda 6, directed by Vladimir Popescu Doreanu, 1965
 Telegrame after I.L. Caragiale, directed by Aurel Miheleș & Gheorghe Naghi, 1959
 Doi vecini after  Tudor Arghezi, directed by  Geo Saizescu, 1958
 Regina (2008) as Taisia, Cristofor's second wife
 Aniela (2009) as Păuna Vulturesco
 Moștenirea (2010) as Zenobia Popeangă
 Spitalul de demență (2012) as Senator's wife

References

External links 

1925 births
2018 deaths
Actresses from Bucharest
Romanian film actresses
Romanian stage actresses
Romanian philanthropists
20th-century philanthropists